Borgestad Church is a parish church of the Church of Norway in Skien Municipality in Vestfold og Telemark county, Norway. It is located in the village of Borgestad. It is the church for the Borgestad parish which is part of the Skien prosti (deanery) in the Diocese of Agder og Telemark. The white, stone church was built in a long church design in 1907 using plans drawn up by the architect Henrik Nissen. The church seats about 382 people.

History
The earliest existing historical records of the church date back to the year 1398, but the church was not built that year. Very little is known about that church and it was likely closed down by the sometime before the Reformation.

In the early 1900s, Prime Minister Gunnar Knudsen gave land and financed the construction of a new church in Borgestad. The new building was designed by Henrik Nissen. Construction of the new building began in the winter of 1903–1904 and continued until 1906. The new church was consecrated on 24 May 1907. The new limestone long church was inspired by English country churches. It has an asymmetrically placed bell tower, which was popular at the time. The church has an entrance in the south, and in the north is a choir which is surrounded by vestries. The church was decorated with stained glass by Emanuel Vigeland in 1918–1919 and it was painted inside by Ulrik Hendriksen in 1921. The building received electric lighting for its fiftieth anniversary in 1957. In April 2011, there was an arson attempt on a bench outside Borgestad church, this was the same night that the Østre Porsgrunn Church burned down due to arson.

Media gallery

See also
List of churches in Agder og Telemark

References

Buildings and structures in Skien
Churches in Vestfold og Telemark
Long churches in Norway
Stone churches in Norway
20th-century Church of Norway church buildings
Churches completed in 1907
1907 establishments in Norway